Gilroy Unified School District is located in the southernmost tip of Santa Clara Valley, California.

The Gilroy Unified School District was created in 1966 when several small school districts joined together with the Gilroy School District. The other school districts included San Ysidro and Rucker. It covers an area of over 600 square miles, and during the 2012–2013 school year had approximately 11,000 students.

The school district currently consists of four high schools (Gilroy High School, Christopher High School, Gilroy Early College Academy, and Mt. Madonna Continuation High School), three middle schools (Brownell, Solorsano, and South Valley), and eight elementary schools (Antonio Del Buono, El Roble, Eliot, Glen View, Las Animas, Luigi Aprea, Rod Kelley, and Rucker).  The District also operates a pre-school program.

One charter school, Gilroy Prep School, has been chartered by the school board and opened in 2011 serving students grades K - 8.

Awards and recognition
 Christopher High - 2015 California Gold Ribbon School 
 Gilroy High - 1994  and 2009  California Distinguished School
 Gilroy Early College Academy - 2015 California Gold Ribbon School, 2013 California Distinguished School 
 Mt. Madonna Continuation - 2015 California Model Continuation High School 
 Ascencion Solorsano Middle - 2007 and 2013 California Distinguished School, 2007 Title I Academic Achievement School
 Brownell Middle - 2015 California Gold Ribbon School 
 Glen View Elementary - 1997 California Distinguished School
 Las Animas Elementary - 2016 California Gold Ribbon Schools Award, 2008 California Distinguished School, 2009 Title I Academic Achievement School 
 Rod Kelley Elementary - 2016 California Gold Ribbon Schools Award

Schools 
High Schools
 Gilroy High School
 Dr. TJ Owens Gilroy Early College Academy (GECA)
 Christopher High School
 Mt. Madonna Continuation High School
Middle Schools
 South Valley Middle School
 Brownell Middle School
 Ascencion Solorsano Middle School
Elementary Schools
 Rucker Elementary School
 Eliot Elementary School
 Glen View Elementary School
 Las Animas Elementary School
 Antonio del Buono Elementary School
 Luigi Aprea Elementary School
 El Roble Elementary School
 Rod Kelley Elementary School
Charter Schools
Gilroy Prep School

Board of education 
Gilroy Unified is overseen by a publicly elected seven member board of education, elected at-large for four year terms.  Among its duties, this body appoints the superintendent to function as the district's chief executive for carrying out day-to-day decisions and policy implementations.

The term for these trustees ends in 2020:
 Mark Good
 BC Doyle
 James E. Pace

The term for these trustees expires in 2018:
 Heather Bass
 Linda Piceno
 Pat Midtgaard
 Jaime Rosso

References

External links

 
 Gilroy Prep School

School districts in Santa Clara County, California
Gilroy, California
1966 establishments in California
School districts established in 1966